Laypeople or laypersons may refer to:

 Someone who is not an expert in a particular field of study
 Lay judge
 Lay judges in Japan
 Laity, members of a church who are not clergy
 Lay brother
 Lay sister
 Lay preacher
 Lay apostolate
 Lay cardinal
 Lay reader
 Lay speaker
 Lay leader